The Charles Koester House at 919 Broadway in Marysville, Kansas was built in 1873.  It was listed on the National Register of Historic Places in 1975.

It was the home of Charles F. Koester.  It has been termed "The Most Beautiful House in Kansas", by dint of the quality of the house plus extensive landscaping.

It has also been known as the Koester House Museum.

The house is also included in the NRHP-listed Koester Block Historic District.  The district also contains the home of Charles F. Koestler's son, Charles J. D. Koester, which is named the Charles J.D. Koester House, and which faces onto Elm Street.

References

Houses on the National Register of Historic Places in Kansas
Houses completed in 1873
Marshall County, Kansas